Ty O'Neal McClary (born August 2, 1978) is an American actor.

Career
He is best known for playing the ice-skating cowboy Dwayne Robertson in D2: The Mighty Ducks and D3: The Mighty Ducks. McClary became close with Kenan Thompson while working on the films. The two lived together for a while during filming. In 2001 he portrayed real-life outlaw Clell Miller in American Outlaws alongside Colin Farrell, Scott Caan, and Gabriel Macht.

Today, O'Neal is a member of the Professional Rodeo Cowboys Association (PRCA). His events are team roping, tie-down roping, and steer wrestling. TY  also frequently hosts for Western Sports Round-Up, a rodeo centric sports show for the Cowboy Channel. He also is a main anchor for the cowboy channel and does many more TV broadcasting for them.

He has appeared in a frequently played Holiday Inn commercial as a bull rider.

Personal life
O'Neal married his wife Christie in 2005. Christie McClary is also a rodeo cowgirl who had previously modeled in woman's western wear catalogs. The couple moved to North Texas, where they raise and train quarter horses. Occasionally, they travel on the PRCA rodeo circuit, of which O'Neal is a member. McClary also has a daughter, that also rodeos and does events such as Team Roping and Breakaway. She will soon be modeling in march of 2023.

Filmography

References

External links

1978 births
Living people
People from Abilene, Texas
Roping (rodeo)
Steer wrestlers
People from Sanger, Texas